Lasiodiplodia iraniensis is an endophytic fungus. It was first isolated in Mangifera indica, Eucalyptus and citrus species, Salvadora persica, Juglans species and Terminalia catappa in Iran. It has since been isolated in other plants in other continents, and is considered a plant pathogen. L. iraniensis is phylogenetically distinct from other species, but is closely related to L. theobromae; although conidia of L. iraniensis are smaller than the former. Dimensions of the conidia of L. iraniensis are similar to those of L. parva, but the subglobose conidia with rounded ends distinguish this species from L. parva.

Description
Its conidiomata are stromatic and pycnidial; its mycelium are uniloculate, up to 980μm in size, being non-papillate with a central ostiole. Its paraphyses are cylindrical and thin-walled, while conidiophores are absent. Its conidiogenous cells are holoblastic and smooth, while the conidia are aseptate and subglobose.

References

Further reading
Marques, Marília W., et al. "Species of Lasiodiplodia associated with mango in Brazil." Fungal Diversity 61.1 (2013): 181–193.
Sakalidis, Monique L., et al. "Pathogenic Botryosphaeriaceae associated with Mangifera indica in the Kimberley region of Western Australia." European journal of plant pathology 130.3 (2011): 379–391.
Van der Linde, Johannes Alwyn, et al. "Lasiodiplodia species associated with dying Euphorbia ingens in South Africa." Southern Forests: a Journal of Forest Science 73.3-4 (2011): 165–173.

External links
MycoBank

Botryosphaeriaceae
Fungi described in 2010